Vyborg is a railway station, located in the town of Vyborg in Leningrad Oblast, Russia.

The first wooden station building was built in 1870. The second station building was built in 1913 but was destroyed in the Continuation War. The current station building was built in the Soviet Union.

History

First and second buildings

The first station building in Vyborg, presumed to have been designed by either Knut Nylander or Wolmar Westling, was completed in 1870 and was deemed a class I station along the Riihimäki–Saint Petersburg railway.

The second station was designed by Finnish architects Eliel Saarinen and Herman Gesellius. The granite station building was built in 1913 by Finnish State Railways, now known as VR Group, but was destroyed as retreating Soviet troops blew it up in the Continuation War in 1941.

The original building bore a close resemblance to Eliel Saarinen's other famous work, the Helsinki Central railway station. In the tradition of a pair of male human figures on each side of the main entrance of the Helsinki Central station, the Vyborg station had a statue of a bear standing on a pedestal on each side of the main entrance.

Virtual model of old Viipuri railway station as it was in Finland 1939 was rendered 2007–2009. It is possible to see in Virtual Viipuri-project.

Modern building
The modern station building, built in Soviet times, represents the typical Stalinist style. The station building has ticket sales, a café, a magazine kiosk, a currency exchange office, and deposit boxes.

From 2009 onward, the station has been served by Helsinki–Saint Petersburg high speed trains operated by Karelian Trains, a joint venture between Russian Railways and VR (Finnish Railways).

Gallery

See also
Riihimäki–Saint Petersburg railway
Vyborg–Joensuu railroad

References

External links

A picture of the former station building
RAUTATIEASEMA

Railway stations in Leningrad Oblast
Transport in Vyborg
Buildings designed by Eliel Saarinen
Railway stations in the Russian Empire opened in 1870
Buildings and structures in Vyborg
1870 establishments in Finland
Art Nouveau architecture in Finland
Art Nouveau architecture in Russia
Art Nouveau railway stations
Cultural heritage monuments in Leningrad Oblast